The Blue Bottle coffee house was one of the first coffee houses in Vienna, Austria. It was founded in 1686 by Polish-Ukrainian Jerzy Franciszek Kulczycki, a hero of the Battle of Vienna.

Background
According to legend, the Blue Bottle was Vienna's first-ever coffeehouse. The story goes that Kulczycki was the only person to recognize that the sacks of dark-brown beans left behind by the invading Ottoman Turks were coffee beans, and he used these spoils to open up a coffeehouse. However, more recent research shows that the first Viennese coffeehouse actually opened in 1685 (one year prior to the Blue Bottle). Many of the stories about Kulczycki were invented by Gottfried Uhlich in 1783.

In honor of the historic Vienna coffeehouse, the "Blue Bottle" name was adopted in the 21st century by the Blue Bottle Coffee Company, a coffee roaster and chain of coffee shops based in Oakland, California, US.

See also 
 Coffee
 List of restaurants in Vienna

References 

Coffeehouses and cafés in Vienna
1686 establishments in Europe